Donald Morrison MacKay (October 9, 1889 – May 19, 1953) was a Canadian politician. He served in the Legislative Assembly of British Columbia from 1933 to 1937  from the electoral district of Cariboo, a member of the Liberal party. He resigned in 1937 to become Commissioner of Indian Affairs for British Columbia.

References

1889 births
1953 deaths